Mihajlo Bučić was a 16th-century Catholic priest who converted to Protestantism and became its propagandist.

Career 
The date and place of Bučić's birth and death are unknown. Bučić was a vicar in Belica and in Međimurje. Until 1565 he was a vicar in Stenjevac but had to move to estate of  Juraj IV Zrinski in Nedelišće because of the conflict with Franjo Tahi. In 1574 Juraj Drašković, the bishop of the Roman Catholic Archdiocese of Zagreb, strictly followed recommendations of the Council of Trent and expelled Bučić from Catholic church
under accusations that his book was heretic propaganda of Protestantism. Drašković also ordered burning of Bučićs books and publishing of new books to dispute writings of Bučić. It is possible that Postilla authored by Antun Vramec is published in 1586 in Varaždin to follow the orders of Drašković.

Bučić significantly contributed to spreading of Protentantism in the Habsburg Kingdom of Croatia. Because Bučić enjoyed protection of the lord of Međimurje, Juraj IV Zrinski, thanks to whom (and later to his sons) this area was the only significant stronghold of Protestantism in Croatia for 50 years.

Bibliography 
Bučić was the forerunner of the Varaždin literary circle and one of the first writers on Kajkavian dialect. Two books he wrote were banned and burned during period of the counter reformation movement so there is no evidence about the language or script he used in them. Still, it is assumed that he wrote his works on Kajkavian dialect and also on Latin language. According to some sources Bučić published three of his works in Nedelišće. There are disputes if he wrote only on Latin language, or probably on Kajkavian or even Čakavian dialect. The Latin language title of his book he published probably between 6 February 1573 and 6 March 1574 was Contra realem praesentiam Corporis et Sanguinis Christi in sacramento Eucharistiae.

References

Sources

Further reading 
  Vjekoslav Klaić, "Mihajlo Bučić i Franjo Tahi", Nastavni vjesnik, 1922

History of the Serbo-Croatian language
16th-century Croatian people
16th-century deaths